Manal Braiga better known as Kenza Braiga (born 13 November 1976 in Baghdad, Iraq) is a French television contestant, actress and author of Iraqi origin, she is simply known as Kenza Braiga.
She and her family left Iraq during the Gulf War, in February 1991, when she was only 14. She is author of "Un jour j'ai quitté Bagdad", which is about her escape from Iraq, it was released in April 2003.
She was made known in France by appearing on reality television show Loft Story. She starred as a host in French television series Boudoir, Le.

She currently lives in Paris.

Author

 Un jour j'ai quitté Bagdad (One day I left Baghdad)
 J'ai deux amours (I have two loves)
 2 femmes en colere  (Two Women in anger (Jewishitizens and free))

References

External links
Official Site in French

1976 births
Living people
Writers from Baghdad
Iraqi emigrants to France
Iraqi women writers
Iraqi writers
Iraqi television actresses
Participants in French reality television series
Iraqi memoirists
21st-century Iraqi novelists